William Conrad "Buzz" Schneider (born September 14, 1954) is an American former ice hockey player best remembered for his role on the US Olympic hockey team that won the gold medal at the 1980 Winter Olympics in Lake Placid. He was also a member of the US Olympic hockey team at the 1976 Winter Olympics.

Amateur career
Schneider is from Croatian ancestry. His nickname "Buzz" comes from his grandmother calling him the Croatian word for "brother" when he was a baby, which sounds like "buzz." He grew up in Babbitt, Minnesota, where he played hockey, baseball and football at Babbitt High School.

After attending the University of Minnesota, where he played on the Golden Gophers under Herb Brooks and won the 1974 NCAA Hockey Championship, Schneider was drafted 98th overall in the 1974 NHL amateur draft by the Pittsburgh Penguins and 73rd overall in the 1974 WHA Amateur Draft by the Minnesota Fighting Saints.

International and professional career
Schneider played for the United States national team from 1974–76 at the 1974, 1975 and 1976 Ice Hockey World Championships, as well as the 1976 Olympic team) before turning professional. He played in a variety of minor leagues before playing four games for the Birmingham Bulls of the World Hockey Association (WHA) during the 1976-77 season. After the end of the WHA season, he returned to play for the US national team at the 1977 World Ice Hockey Championships tournament in Vienna. Schneider returned to the minor leagues in 1977-78. He played two seasons in the International Hockey League (IHL) before regaining his amateur status to play in the 1980 Olympics.

During the 1979–80 season, the left wing played 62 games for the national team scoring 27 goals. During the Miracle on Ice run in the Olympics, he scored five goals and notched three assists in seven games en route to the gold medal. Schneider played on the Olympic team's top-scoring "Iron Rangers" or "Conehead" line with John Harrington and Mark Pavelich.

After the Olympics he played in Bern, Switzerland, until 1983. Schneider returned to the US national hockey team for the 1982 Ice Hockey World Championships tournament in Helsinki.

Post-playing career
After retiring from the game in 1983, Schneider returned to Minneapolis and worked as a sales executive for a semi-trailer company. He quit his job in 2001 to gain a commercial real estate license.

Schneider was inducted into the United States Hockey Hall of Fame in 2003 as member of the 1980 Olympic team. He has two sons, Billy and Neal. He is now the coordinator of the Turkey men's national ice hockey team.

In popular culture
In the 1981 TV movie Miracle on Ice, Schneider is played by Jonathan Segal.

Buzz's son Billy portrayed him in the 2004 Disney movie Miracle. When director Gavin O'Connor was made aware of the family connection, he stated that he immediately wanted to offer Billy a role in the film.

On the animated TV series American Dad, Buzz is also alluded to as Roger's persona "Chex Lemineux" in the episode "Return of the Bling". This is unconfirmed, but he is one of the only players not referenced in the episode. Roger is also present in place of Buzz in several photos shown in the slide show at the 1980 Olympic team reunion in the episode.

Career statistics

Regular season and playoffs

International

References

External links
 
 Schneider's bio at HockeyDraftCentral

1954 births
1980 US Olympic ice hockey team
American men's ice hockey left wingers
American people of Croatian descent
Birmingham Bulls players
Hampton Gulls (SHL) players
Ice hockey players at the 1976 Winter Olympics
Ice hockey players at the 1980 Winter Olympics
Ice hockey players from Minnesota
Living people
Medalists at the 1980 Winter Olympics
Milwaukee Admirals (IHL) players
Minnesota Fighting Saints draft picks
Minnesota Golden Gophers men's ice hockey players
Olympic gold medalists for the United States in ice hockey
Oklahoma City Blazers (1965–1977) players
People from Grand Rapids, Minnesota
People from St. Louis County, Minnesota
Pittsburgh Penguins draft picks
SC Bern players
Springfield Indians players
NCAA men's ice hockey national champions